Florence Agnes Dillsworth (1937–2000), was a Sierra Leonean educator who served as principal of St. Joseph's Convent School and was the third mayor of Freetown, Sierra Leone.

Early life
Florence Agnes Dillsworth was born to Sierra Leone Creole parents, Wilmot Aloysius Dillsowrth (1908–1985), the town clerk of Freetown, and Jeanne Dillsworth, née Peacourt. Florence Dillsworth attended the St. Joseph's Convent School in Freetown, Sierra Leone and was subsequently educated in England.

Political career
Florence Dillsworth was elected as the third female mayor of Freetown on the Freetown City Council.

Death
Dillsworth died in 2000 in Freetown, Sierra Leone, and was buried in Ascension Town Cemetery.

References
https://allafrica.com/stories/200003030314.html
https://allafrica.com/stories/200805200505.html
https://www.tribpub.com/gdpr/courant.com/

Sierra Leone Creole people
Sierra Leonean people of French descent
20th-century Sierra Leonean women politicians
20th-century Sierra Leonean politicians
Sierra Leonean city councillors
Mayors of Freetown
Sierra Leonean educators
Women mayors of places in Sierra Leone
1935 births
2000 deaths